The chief minister of Telangana is the chief executive of the Indian state of Telangana. In accordance with the Constitution of India, the governor is a state's de jure head, but de facto executive authority rests with the chief minister. Following elections to the Telangana Legislative Assembly, the state's governor usually invites the party (or coalition) with a majority of seats to form the government. The governor appoints the chief minister, whose council of ministers are collectively responsible to the assembly. Given that he has the confidence of the assembly, the chief minister's term is for five years and is subject to no term limits.

Since the state's creation on 2 June 2014, Telangana has had only one chief minister, who belongs to Bharat Rashtra Samithi party, its founder and former Minister of Labour and Employment of the Republic of India K. Chandrashekar Rao is an inaugural and current holder of the office who sworn in two times by winning the 2014 and 2018 assembly elections consecutively.

The current incumbent is K. Chandrashekar Rao of the Bharat Rashtra Samithi since 2 June 2014.

List

See also
 History of Telangana
 Elections in Telangana
 Telangana Secretariat
 Telangana Legislative Assembly
 List of current Indian chief ministers
 List of deputy chief ministers of Telangana
 List of chief ministers of Andhra Pradesh

Notes

References

External links 

  Official Website of the Office of the Chief Minister

Telangana
Chief Ministers of Telangana
People from Telangana
Telangana-related lists